Carll S. Burr Mansion is a historic home located at Commack in Suffolk County, New York. It is an imposing -story, seven bay shingled residence.  The decorative roofline features a flat roofed belvedere with a bracketed cornice and a mansard roof.  It was built about 1830 and remodeled in the Second Empire style between 1881 and 1885. Also on the property are a contributing barn and cottage. Additionally it was said to be a horse race training farm during the 19th Century.

It was added to the National Register of Historic Places in 1985.

References

Houses on the National Register of Historic Places in New York (state)
Second Empire architecture in New York (state)
Houses completed in 1830
Houses in Suffolk County, New York
1830 establishments in New York (state)
National Register of Historic Places in Suffolk County, New York